Bucha may refer to:

Places

Germany 
 Bucha, Saxony-Anhalt, a village 
 Bucha, Saale-Holzland, Thuringia, a small municipality 
 Bucha, Saale-Orla, Thuringia, a small village

Ukraine 
 Bucha, Kyiv Oblast, a city in Ukraine
 Bucha (village), Kyiv Oblast, a village in Ukraine
 Bucha Raion, a region of Ukraine

People 
 Heather Bucha, actress and author, wife of Frank Whaley
 Johnny Bucha (1925–1996), U.S. basketball player
  (1906–1971), German writer
  (1868–1939), German singer musician
 Malik Khuda Bakhsh Bucha (1905–2002), Minister of Agriculture for Pakistan
 Nimra Bucha (active from 2006), Pakistani television actress
 Paul Bucha (born 1943), U.S. Medal of Honor recipient and American Vietnam War veteran
 Pavel Bucha (born 1998), Czech hockey player
 Sana Bucha (born 1977), Pakistani television journalist

Other uses 
 Battle of Bucha during the 2022 Russian invasion of Ukraine
 Bucha massacre, the killing and abuse of Ukrainian civilians by Russian troops
 Bucha effect, a seizure-inducing flashing light effect
 FC Bucha, Bucha, Kyiv, Ukraine; a soccer team

See also 

 Kombucha, or 'bucha

Pakistani names
Urdu-language surnames
German-language surnames